This article is a list of schools in Gary, Indiana (USA).

Public schools
Most of Gary is served by the Gary Community School Corporation.

Some portions are served by the Lake Ridge Schools Corporation.

Some Gary residents in the outskirts attend schools administered by the River Forest Community School Corporation; River Forest does not operate any schools in Gary.

There are also two Head Start Schools operated independently funded by the government.

Head Start
La Casa Head Start, Inc
Geminus Head Start XXI

Charter schools
21st Century Charter School of Gary
Charter School of the Dunes
Gary Lighthouse Charter School
KIPP: Lead College Prep Charter School
Thea Bowman Leadership Academy
West Gary Lighthouse Charter School
Aspire Charter School Academy

Private schools
Acts Christian Academy
Abundant Life Tabernacle Day Care And School
Ambassador Academy
Ascension Lutheran Christian School 
Black Oak School for the Deaf
Christ Baptist Christian Academy
Christian Academy Ministry
M C Bennett Holiness School
New Shiloh Baptist School
SDA Mizpah Church School
Spirit Of God Accelerated Education
Tender Loving Care Academy
Treasure's Child Development Center

Adult education

Schools
Lake Ridge Schools Adult Education
API Flight School

Colleges and Universities
Ivy Tech Community College Northwest
Indiana University Northwest
Lovells Barber College

References

External links
Gary Community School Corporation Official Site
Lake Ridge Schools Corporation Official Site
Indiana University Northwest Official Site
Ivy Tech Community College Northwest Official Site

 
Gary